Antons Lake, is a lake located to the north-west of Minnedosa in Manitoba. The lake is situated at the intersection between Manitoba Highway 16 and Manitoba Highway 10.

Recreation 
Due to the presence of Rainbow trout in the lake, it is a popular fishing spot.

References 

Lakes of Manitoba